The Missing Piece may refer to:

 The Missing Piece (book), a children's book by Shel Silverstein
 The Missing Piece (film), a 2015 Taiwanese film
 The Missing Piece (Gentle Giant album), 1977
 The Missing Piece (Twins album), by Twins, 2005
 "The Missing Piece" (song), a 2021 song by Paul Rey
 "The Missing Piece", a 2000 song by Faraquet from The View from this Tower

See also
 The Missing Peace, a 2004 book by Dennis Ross
 "Missing Piece", a 2021 song by Vance Joy
 Missing Pieces (disambiguation)